The Tourist is a 1921 American silent comedy film directed by Jess Robbins and starring Oliver Hardy.

Cast
 Jimmy Aubrey as The tourist
 Oliver Hardy as Leader of the outlaws (as Babe Hardy)
 Zella Ingraham

See also
 List of American films of 1921
 Oliver Hardy filmography

References

External links

1921 films
1921 comedy films
1921 short films
American silent short films
American black-and-white films
Films directed by Jess Robbins
Silent American comedy films
American comedy short films
1921 lost films
Lost comedy films
1920s American films
1920s English-language films